Heike Gehrmann (born 18 May 1968 in Bremen) is a German former field hockey player who competed in the 1988 Summer Olympics.

References

External links
 

1968 births
Living people
German female field hockey players
Olympic field hockey players of West Germany
Field hockey players at the 1988 Summer Olympics
Sportspeople from Bremen